The Asia Rugby Championship, or ARC, is an annual rugby union competition held amongst national rugby sides within the Asia Rugby region. The competition was originally known as the Asian Rugby Football Tournament when founded in 1969, and was called the Asian Five Nations from 2008 to 2014.

The winner of the competition's top division is recognised as the rugby champion of Asia. The top division, sometimes referred to as the Tri Nations, includes the top three Asian teams each season. Division 1 includes the next four teams and Division 2 includes the next four. Division three is  further divided geographically, with each of the West, East and South Central divisions including three teams.

As of 2017, Japan is the most successful team, securing 25 out of a possible 30 titles since 1969. They have not participated in the series since 2017.

History
The competition was formed as the Asian Rugby Football Tournament in 1969. Chinese Taipei, Hong Kong, Japan, Korea and Thailand contested the inaugural Asian title. Japan were the champions on that occasion.

The tournament was held biennially for the most of its first four decades. It wasn't until 1982 that South Korea became the second team to win the title. The number of teams participating varied from year to year, with as many as 12 teams competing as other Asian teams joined the competition. From 1969 to 1996, there was a single division split into two groups. But in 1998, a second division was introduced as the game began to grow in Asia.

In 2003, a second Asian competition called the Asian Rugby Series was formed. The Asian Rugby Series ran alongside the Rugby Championship to help determine divisional allocations for the Asian Rugby Championship. With more teams competing, a third division was added to the Rugby Championship in 2004. The dual competitions ran until 2007.

Asian Five Nations (2008–14)
In 2008, the ARFU merged the Rugby Championship and Rugby Series into the Asian Five Nations. The competition became an annual championship and a promotion-relegation format was introduced. The winner of Division 2 replaced the loser of Division 1, and the winner of Division 1 replaced the loser of the Five Nations. For its inaugural years, no Division 3 took place, though several regional divisions were implemented across Asia. During the time of this competition, the main Five Nations division was dominated by Japan, South Korea and Hong Kong; the only three teams never to have been relegated to a lower division.

Asia Rugby Championship (2015 onward)
The competition was revamped again for the 2015 season as the Asia Rugby Championship. Under the new format, the top three teams formed a Tri nations division. A promotion-relegation challenge was instituted whereby the Division 1 winner had to defeat the Tri nations third place-getter to gain promotion for the next season.

Format
The current format sees the competition separated into various divisions, with a promotion and relegation format operated into each division. However, this only applies to Division 1 through 3, as the loser of the Tri Nations Division will play a play-off match against the winner of Division 1 to determine the third Tri Nations team for the following year. Where as the winners of Division 2 will automatically replace the loser of Division 1, and the two bottom placed teams in Division 2 will both be relegated down to one of the three regions in Division 3; West, East or South Central. Each of the three regions are made up three teams, and as of 2015, only the winners of the South Central and East divisions can be promoted to Division 2. This is because, the teams competing in the West region, are not considered as full members by World Rugby.

In 2015 in the main Tri Nations division, each team played each other on a home and away basis, picking up 5 points for a win and 3 for a draw. 2 additional points are up for grabs through bonus points, but in order to earn them, teams need to score 4 or more tries in a match, or when losing, lose by 7 points or less. In 2016 the points awarded were changed to 4 points for a win and 1 point for a draw with bonus points the same. For all Divisions, 1 through to 3, nations will only play each other once, with one of the included teams hosting all matches at home. These teams will also aim to pick points up for a win or draw, and gain bonus points. For all divisions, the team with the most table points wins their respective divisions, and if possible, earns promotion to the next division.

Current divisions

As of 2022, the competition divisions are:

Previous winners

All-time summary
As of the 2022 Asia Rugby Championship.

Asia Rugby Championship

Notes:
 Relegated to the division below

 Able to be challenged by the winner of the division below to play in a promotion-relegation play-off.

 Japan—as hosts of the 2019 Rugby World Cup–did not defend their Asia rugby Championship title in 2018 to allow the Tri Nations competition to form part of the 2019 Rugby World Cup – Asia qualification process. Instead of returning to the trinations for 2019, Japan played the Pacific Nations to prepare for the World Cup.

Division tournaments

Notes:
 Relegated to the division below.

 Won promotion, or the right to a challenge play-off for promotion, to the division above.

See also
 Asia Rugby Women's Championship
 ARFU Asian Rugby Series – a former competition that merged with the ARC to become the Asian Five Nations in 2008.
 Asia Rugby
 Rugby union in Asia

References

External links
 Asia Rugby
 ARFU Asian 5 Nations
 New structure announced
 World Rugby

 
Rugby union competitions in Asia for national teams
Recurring sporting events established in 1969
1969 establishments in Asia
Asian championships